American Water is an American public utility company that, through its subsidiaries, provides water and wastewater services in the United States. It offers water and wastewater services to approximately 1,700 communities in 14 states serving a population of approximately 14 million through 3.4 million customer connections. The company's customers include residential, commercial, fire service and private fire, industrial, government facilities, and other water and wastewater utilities. 

American Water shares are traded on the NYSE under the ticker AWK.

History

The utility was founded in 1886 as the American Water Works & Guarantee Company. In 1914, American Water Works and Guarantee Company became American Water Works and Electric Company. In 1947 it was reorganized as American Water Works Company, Inc.

Most of American Water's services are locally managed utility subsidiaries that are regulated by the U.S. state in which each operates. American Water also owns subsidiaries that manage municipal drinking water and wastewater systems under contract and others that supply businesses and residential communities with water management products and services.  

With headquarters in Camden, New Jersey, American Water has about 6,400 professionals who provide drinking water, wastewater and related services to over 14 million people in 24 U.S. states.

In 2003, American Water established the American Water Military Services Group, which enters into long-term contracts with the United States Military to treat and supply water and to collect and treat wastewater on 18 United States military installations.

Utilities 
The company owns 80 surface water treatment plants, 480 groundwater treatment plants, 160 wastewater treatment plants, 52,500 miles of pipes,1,100 groundwater wells, 1,700 pumping stations, 1,300 water storage facilities, and 76 dams. Throughout its networks, the company serves 14 million people with drinking water, wastewater, and related services. Services provided by American Water's utilities are subject to regulation by multiple state utility commissions or other entities engaged in utility regulation. Federal, state and local governments also regulate environmental, health and safety, and water quality and water accountability matters.

See also
Public services

References
Notes

General sources
American Water’s Walter Lynch Joins Other Industry Leaders to Discuss Cybersecurity with President Biden (Businesswire, 25 August 2021)
On the Waterfront: American Water opens Camden headquarters (The Courier-Post, 4 December 2018)

Further reading

External links
American Water.com: About us
Fox Business Network

Companies in the Dow Jones Utility Average
Water companies of the United States
Companies listed on the New York Stock Exchange
American companies established in 1886
Companies based in Camden, New Jersey